A school library (or a school library media center) is a library within a school where students, staff, and often, parents of a public or private school have access to a variety of resources. The goal of the school library media center is to ensure that all members of the school community have equitable access "to books and reading, to information, and to information technology." A school library media center "uses all types of media... is automated, and utilizes the Internet [as well as books] for information gathering." School libraries are distinct from public libraries because they serve as "learner-oriented laboratories which support, extend, and individualize the school's curriculum... A school library serves as the center and coordinating agency for all material used in the school."

Researchers have demonstrated that school libraries have a positive impact on student achievement through the more than 60 studies that have been conducted in 19 U.S. states and one Canadian province. The major finding of these studies was that students with access to a well-supported school library media program with a qualified school library media specialist, scored higher on reading assessments regardless of their socio-economic statuses. In addition, a study conducted in Ohio revealed that 99.4% of students surveyed believed that their school librarians and school library media programs helped them succeed in school. A report that reported similar conclusions was compiled by Michele Lonsdale in Australia in 2003.

History of school libraries
Library services to schools have evolved since the late 1800s from public or state library book wagons to informal classroom collections to what we know today. The later part of the 19th century marked the beginning of the modern American library movement with the creation of the American Library Association (ALA) in 1876 by a group of librarians led by Melvil Dewey. At these beginning stages of development, the school libraries were primarily made up of small collections with the school librarian playing primarily a clerical role.

Dewey wrote that "a broad conception at the end of the century of the work of the schools is simply this, to teach the children to think accurately, with strength and with speed. If it is in the school that they get their start, then where do they get their education?"

1920 marked the first effort by the library and education communities to evaluate school libraries with the publication of the Certain Report, which provided the first yardstick for evaluating school libraries.

By the 1950s, 40% of schools indicated the presence of classroom collections. Around 18% reported having centralized libraries. City schools reported 48% and rural schools reported 12%. School libraries experienced another major push following the launch of Sputnik in 1957, which forced the United States to re-evaluate its priorities for math and science education. NDEA was a response to Sputnik and Title III of NDEA provided financial assistance for strengthening science, mathematics, and modern foreign language. As a result, the 1960s were one of the greatest periods of growth and development for school libraries due to an increased flow of money and support from the private sector and public funding for education. Most notable during this time was the Knapp School Libraries Project<ref></ref> which established model school library media centers across the country. Hundreds of new school libraries were expanded and renovated during this time.

Most recently, school libraries have been defined by two major guidelines documents: Information Power (1988) and Information Power II (1998).

In 1999 the International Federation of Library Associations and Institutions (IFLA) published the globally important Unesco School library Manifesto, which states:
"The school library provides information and ideas that are fundamental to functioning successfully in today’s information and knowledge-based society. The school library equips students with life-long learning skills and develops the imagination, enabling them to live as responsible citizens" (para. 1).

The purpose of the school library

School library media centers in the 21st century can, and should be, hubs for increased student achievement and positive focused school reform.—Kathleen D. Smith 

The school library exists to provide a range of learning opportunities for both large and small groups as well as individuals with a focus on intellectual content, information literacy, and the learner. In addition to classroom visits with collaborating teachers, the school library also serves as a learning space for students to do independent work, use computers, access the internet, use equipment and research materials; to host special events such as author visits and book clubs; and for tutoring and testing.

School libraries function as a central location for all of the information available, and a school librarian functions as the literary map to the resources and materials found within the library.

A school library functions as an opportunity for educators to work with librarians in support of a resource center for the students to be able to safely access the internet for both school work and interacting with each other. In her article, "Tag! You're It!": Playing on the Digital Playground'', De las Casas discusses how today's youth is much more comfortable with technology than ever before, and believes that “We need to advocate for regulations and laws that support education of young people rather than simply limiting their access to the Web.”

The school library media center program is a collaborative venture in which school library media specialists, teachers, and administrators work together to provide opportunities for the social, cultural, and educational growth of students. Activities that are part of the school library media program can take place in the school library media center, the laboratory classroom, through the school, and via the school library's online resources.

In Australia school libraries have played a major role in the success of Reading Challenge programs initiated and funded by various State Governments.

The Premier's Reading Challenge in South Australia, launched by Premier Mike Rann (2002 to 2011) has one of the highest participation rates in the world for reading challenges. It has been embraced by more than 95% of public, private and religious schools.

The school library collection
School libraries are similar to public libraries in that they contain books, films, recorded sound, periodicals, realia, and digital media.  These items are not only for the education, enjoyment, and entertainment of all members of the school community, but also to enhance and expand the school's curriculum.

Budget 
Budget is a critical component of building the library library collection. it is important to utilize those funds for the best interest of the school community.

Staffing of the school library
In many schools, school libraries are staffed by librarians, teacher-librarians, or school library media specialists or media coordinators who hold a specific library science degree. In some jurisdictions, school librarians are required to have specific certification and/or a teaching certificate.

The school librarian performs four leadership main roles: teacher, instructional partner, information specialist, and program administrator. In the teacher role, the school librarian develops and implements curricula relating to information literacy and inquiry.  School librarians may read to children, assist them in selecting books, and assist with schoolwork. Many school librarians also teach technology skills to students, such as keyboarding and Microsoft and Google applications. Some school librarians see classes on a "flexible schedule". A flexible schedule means that rather than having students come to the library for instruction at a fixed time every week, the classroom teacher schedules library time when library skills or materials are needed as part of the classroom learning experience.

In the instructional partner role, school librarians collaborate with classroom teachers to create independent learners by fostering students' research, information literacy, technology, and critical thinking skills.

As information specialists, school librarians develop a resource base for the school by using the curriculum and student interests to identify and obtain library materials, organize and maintain the library collection in order to promote independent reading and lifelong learning. Materials in the library collection can be located using an Online Public Access Catalog (OPAC). Often these catalogs are web-based from which students can gain access both at school and from home.

This role also encompasses many activities relating to technology including the integration of resources in a variety of formats: periodical databases; Web sites; digital video segments; podcasts; blog and wiki content; digital images; virtual classrooms, etc.  School librarians are often responsible for audio-visual equipment and are sometimes in charge of school computers and computer networks.

Many school librarians also perform clerical duties. They handle the circulating and cataloging of materials, facilitate interlibrary loans, shelve materials, perform inventory, etc.

Notable school librarians
Laura Bush – Austin Independent School District
Graham Gardner – Abingdon School
Grant Lyons – Keystone School
Laura Amy Schlitz – Park School of Baltimore

See also
American Association of School Libraries (AASL)
School Library Association (UK)
 Teacher-librarian
 Virtual school library
 Learning Resource Centre
 Hannah Logasa

Notes and references

External links

Unesco School Library Manifesto
American Association of School Librarians
School Library Journal
School Library Media Activities Monthly
Resources for School Libraries
Virtual Learning Resources Center
The Hub: Campaign for Quality School Libraries
Australian School Library Association
Directory of portuguese online school libraries catalogs
Suomen koulukirjastoyhdistys
Siu-Runyan, Yvonne. "Public and School Libraries in Decline: When We Need Them." (Archive). National Council of Teachers of English (NCTE).

 
Library
Libraries by type
Types of library
Educational facilities